Bizzdesign is a Dutch enterprise architecture and BPM SaaS platform vendor, founded in 2000 by Henry Franken, Harmen van den Berg and Harm Bakker, and is known for the co-development of ArchiMate and the development Bizzdesign Enterprise Studio, formerly BiZZdesign Architect, the first tool that supported ArchiMate.

Bizzdesign started as spin-off from a research project (1996-2001) to develop a test environment for business processes, originated by the Telematica Instituut (now Novay) in cooperation with partners such as the IBM, the Dutch Pension Fund APG, Tax and Customs Administration, and the ING Group.

Bizzdesign is the trusted global SaaS Enterprise Architecture platform and recognized as a leader by major analyst firms that helps the world’s leading public and private organizations guarantee the success of investment prioritization, transformation initiatives, and risk management. Bizzdesign helps architects and executives to see a full multi-dimensional picture, find and design the right path and execute with confidence to their targeted future. Bizzdesign also offers consultancy services in the fields of Business Model Management, Enterprise Architecture Management, Infrastructure Architecture, Business Process Management, Decision Model Management, Lean Management and Governance, Risk & Compliance;, and training.

BiZZdesign was recognized a Leader in Gartner's 2021 Enterprise Architecture Magic Quadrant report for the 6th year in a row.

See also 
 ArchiMate
 BiZZdesign Enterprise Studio

References 

Information technology companies of the Netherlands